AO Sellana Football Club is a Greek football club based in Sellana, Karditsa, Greece.

Honours

Domestic Titles and honours

  Karditsa FCA Champions: 3
 2013–14, 2015–16, 2016–17
  Karditsa FCA Cup Winners: 4
 2013–14, 2016–17, 2017–18, 2018–19
  Karditsa FCA Super Cup Winners: 2
 2014, 2016

References

Karditsa (regional unit)
Association football clubs established in 1968
1968 establishments in Greece
Gamma Ethniki clubs